How Big Can You Get?: The Music of Cab Calloway is the sixth studio album released by Big Bad Voodoo Daddy. It features covers of songs by Cab Calloway.

Track listing
"Come On with the "Come On"" (Cab Calloway, Andy Gibson) – 3:22
"Calloway Boogie" (Calloway, Allen Leroy Gibson) – 4:02
"The Call of the Jitterbug" (Calloway, Irving Mills, Ed Swayze) – 3:29
"Hey Now, Hey Now" (Calloway, Elton Hill) – 4:34
"The Jumpin' Jive" (Calloway, Frank Froeba, Jack Palmer) – 4:01
"How Big Can You Get?" (Calloway, Buck Ram) – 4:05
"The Old Man of the Mountain" (George Brown, Victor Young) – 4:15
"The Ghost of Smokey Joe" (Rube Bloom, Ted Koehler) – 5:28
"Reefer Man" (J. Russel Robinson, Andy Razaf) – 2:54
"Minnie the Moocher" (Calloway, Mills) – 4:59
"Tarzan of Harlem" (Lupin Fein, Mills, Henry Nemo, Ram) – 3:24

Personnel
Scotty Morris – vocals, guitar, producer, mixer
Joshua Levy – piano, arranger, producer
Kurt Sodergen – drums
Dirk Shumaker – acoustic bass guitar, vocals
Glen "The Kid" Marhevka – trumpet
Karl Hunter – alto and tenor saxophone, clarinet
Andy Rowley – baritone saxophone, vocals

Additional musicians
Alex "Crazy Legs" Henderson
Anthony Bonsera Jr.
Ira Nepus
Tom Peterson
Lee Thornburg
Bernie Dresel
Nick Lane
Robbie Hioki
Brian Swartz
Scheila Gonzalez
Lee Callet
Jim Fox

References

Big Bad Voodoo Daddy albums
2009 albums